Heterogymna heptanoma is a moth in the family Carposinidae. It was described by Edward Meyrick in 1925. It is found on Seram in Indonesia.

References

Carposinidae
Moths described in 1925